Fierenana, Tsiroanomandidy is a town and commune in Madagascar. It belongs to the district of Tsiroanomandidy, which is a part of Bongolava Region. The population of the commune was estimated to be approximately 21,224 in 2018.

References and notes 

Populated places in Bongolava